The GR 72 is a long-distance walking route of the Grande Randonnée network in France. The route connects Barre-des-Cévennes with Col du Bez.

Along the way, the route passes through:
 Barre-des-Cévennes
 Cassagnas
 Villefort
 Prévenchères
 Saint-Laurent-les-Bains
 Col du Bez

References

Hiking trails in France